The inaugural table tennis competition at the 2002 Commonwealth Games took place in Manchester, England from 25 July - 4 August 2002.

Medallists

Table tennis medal table by country

Men's singles

Women's singles

Men's doubles

Women's doubles

Mixed doubles

Men's team

Gold medal match

Women's team

Gold medal match

References

2002 Commonwealth Games events
2002
Commonwealth